Johan Lauritz Eidem (9 September 18916 July 1984) was a Norwegian politician for the Liberal Party.

He served as a deputy representative to the Norwegian Parliament from Møre og Romsdal during the term 1950–1953.

References

1891 births
1984 deaths
Deputy members of the Storting
Møre og Romsdal politicians
Liberal Party (Norway) politicians